Michael William Tenay (born March 1, 1955) is an American podcast presenter and retired professional wrestling play-by-play announcer known for his time as an announcer for World Championship Wrestling (WCW) and Total Nonstop Action Wrestling (TNA) (now known as Impact Wrestling). Tenay, according to Impact, "is known as 'The Professor' for his extensive knowledge of the sport". Former Impact Executive Producer and WCW president Eric Bischoff has described Tenay as "a walking encyclopedia of knowledge".

Tenay is a five-time recipient of the Wrestling Observer Newsletter award for Best Television Announcer.

Early life
Tenay was born on March 1, 1955, in Los Angeles, California. In 1966, at age 11, Mike Tenay began one of the country's first wrestling newsletters, Mat News. He also made audio recordings of LA wrestling programs and traded them with fans, a precursor to the tape traders who would follow. In the 1970s, Tenay wrote for the Olympic Auditorium's programs and several national wrestling magazines. After high school, he worked as a repairman and then a betting supervisor for a casino. From 1991-1995, Tenay talked about wrestling with the nationally aired late night sports talk radio show "Wrestling Insiders". He interviewed wrestling superstars, including Jesse Ventura, Jim Cornette, and Sting. His work on radio led WCW to hire Tenay to work on the WCW Hotline and do his on-location radio broadcasts at WCW events. This led to Tenay’s first major announcing job with WCW.

Professional wrestling career

World Championship Wrestling (1994–2001)
Mike Tenay made his WCW announcing debut during the World Championship Wrestling (WCW) co-promoted AAA When Worlds Collide pay-per-view in November 1994. Every announcer in WCW, including lead announcer Tony Schiavone, declined to work the broadcast. During this first broadcast, he and Chris Cruise called the match of Los Gringos Locos (Eddy Guerrero and Art Barr) vs. Hijo del Santo and Octagon, judged by the Wrestling Observer Newsletter as a "legendary" five-star match. Following the success of that event, WCW added more luchadores to the roster, and Tenay would appear as a guest announcer during their pay-per-view matches due to his extensive knowledge of holds and maneuvers as well as lucha libre ring psychology. Tenay would later serve as a full-time play-by-play announcer for secondary television shows such as WCW Worldwide and WCW Saturday Night, where he was known as "Iron" Mike Tenay. He was also backstage interviewer for Uncensored 1995.

On September 2, 1996 he was moved up to the main show, WCW Monday Nitro, where he served as a third commentator to the team originally consisting of play-by-play announcer Tony Schiavone and color commentator Bobby Heenan. It was there that Schiavone gave him the nickname "The Professor" for his vast and impressive knowledge of the wrestling business, wrestling history, and wrestling maneuvers.

In light of WCW adding Thunder as another major weekly show in its lineup, the announce team was pulling double duty during the week. Tenay was named the lead announcer for WCW Thunder, with Schiavone and Heenan serving as the on-screen auxiliaries. He remained an announcer with WCW until its purchase by the WWF in 2001.

Total Nonstop Action Wrestling (2002–2016)

In early 2002, Tenay was approached by Jeff Jarrett regarding the play-by-play announcer's slot with Total Nonstop Action Wrestling. Tenay became the voice of the upstart company when it launched in June 2002. From that point onward, Tenay (now sporting a tuxedo at every event) became the voice of TNA, announcing the weekly pay-per-view events, every single episode of Impact Wrestling (originally TNA Impact!) and Xplosion, and every monthly pay-per-view until 2015.

Tenay's role for the company beyond that of play-by-play man has developed both in front of the camera and behind the scenes. After TNA decided to switch to a booking committee format in mid-2005, Tenay was named to the committee, enhancing his formerly modest influence behind the scenes. Tenay also became the prominent on-screen personality for TNA, conducting interviews with Jeff Jarrett (who has labeled Tenay as "the voice of the fans") as well as making major announcements (such as the signing of Sting).

Josh Mathews took Tenay's place as commentator on weekly airings of Impact Wrestling after its move from Spike to Destination America in January 2015. Following this, he briefly hosted Impact Wrestling: Unlocked until its cancellation, and sporadically appeared as backstage announcer or replacement commentator. He also inducted Jeff Jarrett into the TNA Hall of Fame. As of December 2015, Tenay was still employed by TNA but had not appeared on television since July. When Impact debuted on Pop in January, Tenay said his future as an announcer on Impact was uncertain.

In June 2016, Tenay appeared on an episode of The Ross Report podcast with Jim Ross, where he explained that he had quietly departed TNA amicably and has retired from the wrestling business.

Other endeavours
In August 2015, Tenay announced on former wrestler Tazz's podcast the launch of his podcast, Professor Vegas, through CBS Radio's Play.it platform, due to launch on August 6 of that same year. It would focus on sports betting, and feature Tenay's own expert analysis (he was a bookie in Las Vegas for ten years, and a lifelong betting fan) along with interviews with professional gamblers, bookies, linesmakers and athletes.

On July 22, 2016, Tenay tweeted "Sorry to report that I have not been able to reach agreement with CBS Radio for a second year of podcasts." The last recorded podcast was uploaded on June 14, 2016.

Other media
He appeared in the video game TNA Impact! as a downloadable character.

Personal life
Tenay has been married to his wife Karen since 1987. They currently live in Las Vegas, Nevada.

Awards and accomplishments
Wrestling Observer Newsletter
Best Television Announcer (1997, 2002–2005)

References

External links

TNA profile

1955 births
American color commentators
American podcasters
Living people
Professional wrestling announcers
Professional wrestling podcasters
Sportspeople from Los Angeles